Augustine Kasujja (born 26 April 1946) is a Ugandan prelate of the Catholic Church who works in the diplomatic service of the Holy See. He was the Apostolic Nuncio to Belgium from 2016 to 2021.

He was the first black African to hold the title of apostolic nuncio.

Biography
The third in a family of 11 children, he was born to Katalina Nanseko and Yozefu Naluswa in Mitala Maria, Mpigi District on 26 April 1946.

Before joining Kisubi Minor Seminary between 1960 and 1965, he attended Ssango and Mitala Maria Primary Schools. He studied at the major seminary in Katigondo (1966–1967) and the Pontifical Urban University in Rome (1967–1974). He was ordained a priest of the Archdiocese of Kampala on 3 January 1973.

After earning a doctorate in theology, he entered the diplomatic service of the Holy See in 1979. His postings included Argentina, Haiti, Bangladesh, Portugal, Peru, Trinidad and Tobago, Algeria, Tunisia, and Mauritius.

Pope John Paul II appointed him titular archbishop of Caesarea in Numidia and Apostolic Nuncio to Tunisia and Algeria on 26 May 1998. He was the first black African to hold the title of apostolic nuncio. He received his episcopal consecration on 22 August in Rubaga Cathedral from Cardinal Emmanuel Wamala.

On 22 April 2004, Pope John Paul named him Apostolic Nuncio to Madagascar and the Seychelles and Apostolic Delegate to Comoros and Réunion. On 9 June 2004, to those responsibilities were added those of the Nuncio to Mauritius.

On 2 February 2010, Pope Benedict XVI appointed him Apostolic Nuncio to Nigeria. Pope Francis, on 13 December 2013, added to his responsibilities the role of permanent observer to the Economic Community of Western African States (ECOWAS).

On 12 October 2016, Pope Francis appointed him Apostolic Nuncio to Belgium, adding the position of Nuncio to Luxembourg on 7 December. He was the first non-European to occupy the Belgian posting. He presented his credentials to the king and the grand duke on 2 February and 2 March.

Pope Francis accepted his resignation on 31 August 2021.

See also 
Catholic Church in Uganda
List of diplomatic posts of the Holy See
List of heads of the diplomatic missions of the Holy See

References

External links

 

Apostolic Nuncios to Belgium
Apostolic Nuncios to Luxembourg
Apostolic Nuncios to Nigeria
Apostolic Nuncios to Mauritius
Apostolic Nuncios to Seychelles
Apostolic Nuncios to Madagascar
Apostolic Nuncios to Tunisia
Apostolic Nuncios to Algeria
Living people
Ugandan Roman Catholic bishops
1946 births
People from Mpigi District
Pontifical Urban University alumni
21st-century Roman Catholic titular archbishops